The Pro-Cathedral of Our Lady of Perpetual Help or simply Cathedral of Our Lady of Perpetual Help is a religious building located in Harris Promenade in the town of San Fernando, on the island of Trinidad, part of the Caribbean country of Trinidad and Tobago.

The temple follows the Roman or Latin rite and functions as the pro-cathedral (or temporary cathedral) of the Metropolitan Archdiocese of Port of Spain. He received the status of a cathedral by decision of  Pope Benedict XVI in August 2012.

The building began as a wooden church in 1838 which was completed in 1849. In 1948 it was demolished so that in 1950 it was rebuilt in Romanesque style in 1975, was renamed the Church of Our Lady of Perpetual Help, name that is he incorporated the title of pro-cathedral later.

See also
Roman Catholicism in Trinidad and Tobago
Pro-Cathedral

References

Roman Catholic churches in Trinidad and Tobago
Buildings and structures in San Fernando, Trinidad and Tobago
Roman Catholic churches completed in 1838
19th-century Roman Catholic church buildings